The following is a list of events affecting American television in 2007. Events listed include television show debuts, finales, cancellations, and new channel launches.

Notable events

January

February

March

April

May

June

July

August

September

October

November

December

Programs

Debuts

Returning this year

Ending this year

Shows changing networks

Made-for-TV movies

Entering syndication this year

Networks and services

Network launches

Television stations

Station launches

Network affiliation changes

Station closures

Births

Deaths

References

External links
List of 2007 American television series at IMDb

 
2000s in American television